Public opinion is the collective opinion on a specific topic or voting intention relevant to society. It is the people's views on matters affecting them. The term originates from France, and first appeared in the 17th century, though writers had identified the importance of the opinion of the people long before this. Prior to the advent of mass media, public fora such as coffee houses and gentlemen's clubs were used as exchanges of opinion and some reputable locations had great influence. 

In the 21st century, public opinion is widely thought to be heavily influenced by the media, and many studies have been undertaken which look at the different factors which influence public opinion. Politicians and other people concerned with public opinion often attempt to influence it using advertising or rhetoric. One of the struggles of public opinion is how it can be influenced by misinformation.

Etymology 
The term "public opinion" was derived from the French , which was first used in 1588 by Michel de Montaigne in the second edition of his Essays (ch. XXII).

The French term also appears in the 1761 work Julie, or the New Heloise by Jean-Jacques Rousseau.

Precursors of the phrase in English include William Temple's "general opinion" (appearing in his 1672 work On the Original and Nature of Government) and John Locke's "law of opinion" (appearing in his 1689 work An Essay Concerning Human Understanding).

History 
The emergence of public opinion as a significant force in the political realm dates to the late 17th century, but opinion had been regarded as having singular importance much earlier. Medieval fama publica or vox et fama communis had great legal and social importance from the 12th and 13th centuries onward. Later, William Shakespeare called public opinion the "mistress of success" and Blaise Pascal thought it was "the queen of the world".

In his treatise, An Essay Concerning Human Understanding c, John Locke considered that man was subject to three laws: the divine law, the civil law and most importantly in Locke's judgement, the law of opinion or reputation. He regarded the latter as of the highest importance because dislike and ill opinion force people to conform in their behaviour to social norms, however he didn't consider public opinion as a suitable influence for governments.

In his 1672 essay On the Original and Nature of Government, William Temple gave an early formulation of the importance of public opinion. He observed that "when vast numbers of men submit their lives and fortunes absolutely to the will of one, it must be force of custom, or opinion which subjects power to authority". Temple disagreed with the prevalent opinion that the basis of government lay in a social contract and thought that government was merely allowed to exist due to the favour of public opinion.

The prerequisites for the emergence of a public sphere were increasing levels of literacy which was spurred on by the Reformation, which encouraged individuals to read the Bible in the vernacular, and the rapidly expanding printing presses. During the 18th century religious literature was replaced with secular literature, novels and pamphlets. In parallel to this was the growth in reading societies and clubs. At the turn of the century the first circulating library opened in London and the public library became widespread and available to the public.

Coffee-houses 

An institution of central importance in the development of public opinion, was the coffee-house, which became widespread throughout Europe in the mid-17th century. Although Charles II later tried to suppress the London coffeehouses as "places where the disaffected met, and spread scandalous reports concerning the conduct of His Majesty and his Ministers", the public flocked to them. For several decades following the Restoration, the Wits gathered round John Dryden at Will's Coffee House in Russell Street, Covent Garden. The coffee houses were great social levellers, open to all men and indifferent to social status, and as a result associated with equality and republicanism.

More generally, coffee houses became meeting places where business could be carried on, news exchanged and The London Gazette (government announcements) read. Lloyd's of London had its origins in a coffeehouse run by Edward Lloyd, where underwriters of ship insurance met to do business. By 1739, there were 551 coffeehouses in London. Each attracted a particular clientele divided by occupation or attitude, such as Tories and Whigs, wits and stockjobbers, merchants and lawyers, booksellers and authors, men of fashion or the "cits" of the old city center. Joseph Addison wanted to have it said of him that he had "brought philosophy out of closets and libraries to dwell in clubs and assemblies, at tea tables and in coffee houses". According to one French visitor, Antoine François Prévost, coffeehouses, "where you have the right to read all the papers for and against the government", were the "seats of English liberty".

Gentleman clubs 

Gentlemen's clubs proliferated in the 18th century, especially in the West End of London. Clubs took over the role occupied by coffee houses in 18th century London to some degree and reached the height of their influence in the late 19th century. Some notable names were White's, Brooks's, Arthur's and Boodle's which still exist today.

These social changes, in which a closed and largely illiterate public became an open and politicized one, was to become of tremendous political importance in the 19th century as the mass media was circulated ever more widely and literacy was steadily improved. Governments increasingly recognized the importance of managing and directing public opinion. This trend is exemplified in the career of George Canning who restyled his political career from its aristocratic origins to one of popular consent when he contested and won the parliamentary seat in Liverpool, a city with a growing and affluent middle class which he attributed to the growing influence of "public opinion".

Jeremy Bentham was an impassioned advocate of the importance of public opinion in the shaping of constitutional governance. He thought it important that all government acts and decisions should be subject to the inspection of public opinion, because "to the pernicious exercise of the power of government it is the only check". He opined that public opinion had the power to ensure that rulers would rule for the greatest happiness of the greater number. He brought in Utilitarian philosophy in order to define theories of public opinion.

Concepts 

German social theorist Jürgen Habermas contributed the idea of public sphere to the discussion of public opinion. According to Habermas, the public sphere, or bourgeois public, is where "something approaching public opinion can be formed". Habermas claimed that the Public Sphere featured universal access, rational debate, and disregard for rank. However, he believes that these three features for how public opinion are best formed are no longer in place in western liberal democratic countries. Public opinion, in western democracy, is highly susceptible to elite manipulation.

The American sociologist Herbert Blumer has proposed an altogether different conception of the "public". According to Blumer, public opinion is discussed as a form of collective behavior (another specialized term) which is made up of those who are discussing a given public issue at any one time. Given this definition, there are many publics; each of them comes into being when an issue arises and ceases to exist when the issue is resolved. Blumer claims that people participate in public in different capacities and to different degrees. So, public opinion polling cannot measure the public. An educated individual's participation is more important than that of a drunk. The "mass" in which people independently make decisions about, for example, which brand of toothpaste to buy, is a form of collective behavior different from the public.

Public opinion plays an important role in the political sphere. Cutting across all aspects of relationship between government and public opinion are studies of voting behavior. These have registered the distribution of opinions on a wide variety of issues, have explored the impact of special interest groups on election outcomes and have contributed to our knowledge about the effects of government propaganda and policy.

Contemporary, quantitative approaches to the study of public opinion may be divided into four categories:
 Quantitative measurement of opinion distributions.
 Investigation of the internal relationships among the individual opinions that make up public opinion on an issue.
 Description or analysis of the public role of public opinion.
 Study both of the communication media that disseminate the ideas on which opinions are based and of the uses that propagandists and other manipulators make of these media.

The rapid spread of public opinion measurement around the world is reflection of the number of uses to which it can be put. Public opinion can be accurately obtained through survey sampling. Both private firms and governments use surveys to inform public policies and public relations.

Formation 
Numerous theories and substantial evidence exists to explain the formation and dynamics of individuals' opinions. Much of this research draws on psychological research on attitudes. In communications studies and political science, mass media are often seen as influential forces on public opinion. Additionally, political socialization and behavioral genetics sometimes explain public opinion.

Mass media effects 

The formation of public opinion starts with agenda setting by major media outlets throughout the world. This agenda setting dictates what is newsworthy and how and when it will be reported. The media agenda is set by a variety of different environmental and newswork factors that determines which stories will be newsworthy.

Another key component in the formation of public opinion is framing. Framing is when a story or piece of news is portrayed in a particular way and is meant to sway the consumers attitude one way or the other. Most political issues are heavily framed in order to persuade voters to vote for a particular candidate. For example, if Candidate X once voted on a bill that raised income taxes on the middle class, a framing headline would read "Candidate X Doesn't Care About the Middle Class". This puts Candidate X in a negative frame to the news reader.

Social desirability is another key component to the formation of public opinion. Social desirability is the idea that people in general will form their opinions based on what they believe is the prevalent opinion of the social group they identify with. Based on media agenda setting and media framing, most often a particular opinion gets repeated throughout various news mediums and social networking sites, until it creates a false vision where the perceived truth can actually be very far away from the actual truth. When asked for their opinion on a subject about which they are uninformed, people often provide pseudo-opinions they believe will please the questioner.

Public opinion can be influenced by public relations and the political media. Additionally, mass media utilizes a wide variety of advertising techniques to get their message out and change the minds of people. Since the 1950s, television has been the main medium for molding public opinion. Since the late 2000s, the Internet has become a platform for forming public opinion. Surveys have showed that more people get their news from social media and news websites as opposed to print newspapers. The accessibility of social media allows public opinion to be formed by a broader range of social movements and news sources. Gunn Enli identifies the Internet's effect on public opinion as being “characterised by an intensified personalisation of political advocacy and increased anti-elitism, popularisation and populism”. Public opinion has become more varied as a result of online news sources being influenced by political communication and agenda setting.

Role of influentials 

There have been a variety of academic studies investigating whether or not public opinion is influenced by "influentials", or persons that have a significant effect on influencing opinion of the general public regarding any relevant issues.  Many early studies have modeled the transfer of information from mass media sources to the general public as a "two-step" process. In this process, information from mass media and other far-reaching sources of information influences influentials, and influentials then influence the general public as opposed to the mass media directly influencing the public.

While the "two-step" process regarding public opinion influence has motivated further research on the role of influential persons, a more recent study by Watts and Dodds (2007) suggests that while influentials play some role in influencing public opinion, "non-influential" persons that make up the general public are also just as likely (if not more likely) to influence opinion provided that the general public is composed of persons that are easily influenced. This is referred to in their work as the "Influential Hypothesis". The authors discuss such results by using a model to quantify the number of people influenced by both the general public and influentials. The model can be easily customized to represent a variety of ways that influencers interact with each other as well as the general public.  In their study, such a model diverges from the prior paradigm of the "two-step" process. The Watts and Dodds model introduces a model of influence emphasizing lateral channels of influence between the influencers and general public categories. Thus, this leads to a more complex flow of influence amongst the three parties involved in influencing public opinion (i.e. media, influencers and general public).

Relationship with public policy 
The most pervasive issue dividing theories of the opinion-policy relation bears a striking resemblance to the problem of monism-pluralism in the history of philosophy. The controversy deals with the question of whether the structure of socio-political action should be viewed as a more or less centralized process of acts and decisions by a class of key leaders, representing integrated hierarchies of influence in society or whether it is more accurately envisaged as several sets of relatively autonomous opinion and influence groups, interacting with representative decision makers in an official structure of differentiated governmental authority. The former assumption interprets individual, group and official action as part of a single system and reduces politics and governmental policies to a derivative of three basic analytical terms: society, culture and personality.

Despite philosophical arguments regarding public opinion, social scientists (those in sociology, political science, economics and social psychology) present compelling theories to describe how public opinion shapes public policy and find myriad effects of opinion on policy using various empirical research methods. Moreover, researchers find that causal relationships likely run in both directions from opinion to policy and from policy to opinion. On the one hand, public opinion signals public preferences and potential voting behaviors to policymakers. This impact should be greater under more stable democratic institutions. It should be greatest in the realm of social policy because the public are highly motivated by potential goods and services they get from the state. On the other hand, social policy impacts public opinion. The goods and services the public gets via social policy builds normative expectations that shape public opinion. Furthermore, social policy constitutes the largest share of state spending budgets, making it an active and contentious political area. Together these theories suggest that causal effects are part of a feedback loop between opinion and policy. Using increasingly sophisticated methods, scholars are beginning to grasp and identify the feedback of opinion and policy and use this phenomenon to explain the path dependency of institutions.

Relationship with foreign policy 
As with public policy, public opinion also has a close relationship with foreign policy. There is much debate concerning what the relationship is and the study of foreign policy's relationship with public opinion has evolved over time, with the Almond–Lippmann consensus being one of the first attempt to define this relationship. Published before the Vietnam War, Gabriel Almond and Walter Lippmann argued that public opinion about foreign policy was unstructured, incoherent, and highly volatile, and that public opinion shouldn't influence foreign policy. More recent studies have rebuked the Almond-Lippmann Consensus, showing how people's opinions are generally stable, and that while individuals may not be entirely informed about every issue, they still act efficiently and rationally.

People's judgments about issues are often based on heuristics, which are mental shortcuts that allow rational decisions to be made quickly. Heuristics apply to public opinion about domestic as well as foreign policy. The deductive heuristic is one that relies on a person's core values and social groups. Delegative heuristics are influenced by figures of authority such as the media or president.

Another key theory about how people form their opinions on foreign policy issues is Jon Hurwitz and Mark Peffley's hierarchical attitudes model. They argue that it is structured, with core values providing the basis for postures which further influence the ultimate issue position. Public opinion about foreign policy is measured in the same way that all public opinion is measured. Through polls and surveys, respondents are asked about their issue positions. Conclusions are drawn by researchers by applying the scientific method.

Relationship with U.S. presidency 
According to Robert Shapiro, public opinion and policy-making are fundamental to a democracy, which is linked to electoral accountability, meaning that the leader who was elected "will not deviate far from voters’ opinion". A problem that arises when analyzing the data collected by researchers is how these issues that are "important" are selected when collecting the data about public opinion. It is hard to determine if there has been underdevelopment of certain issues. Another concern is how elites influence public opinion by persuasion and rhetoric, ultimately shaping policy-making. These two variables are ambiguous by nature and are hard to get to any conclusions, in most cases beyond the limits of research. Other variables to look at when analyzing the opinion-policy effect are the size of the majority public, election cycle time, degree of electoral competition, and the type of issue. For example, domestic affairs public opinion will be of greater importance than that of foreign affairs because of the complexity.

Since presidents have the ability to influence their political agenda, it is easier for them to respond to public opinion. Since they are not an institution (like Congress), they can also "shift the standards by which the public evaluates their performance in office – away from policy concerns and towards more symbolic activities, image, and personality".

A study by James N. Druckman and Lawrence R. Jacobs discusses how presidents collect their information for policymaking. They found that on one hand, they collect data about the public's preference on salient matters like crime and economy. This reflects a populist type of democracy where the government portrays respect toward the people's views and they are connected. On the other hand, government institutions and elites believe the general populations’ understanding of certain issued is limited, therefore they exercise autonomy when making these decisions.

Baum and Kernell have stated that a challenge that modern presidents face when trying to persuade public opinion is that there is so many different types of media, that getting people's attention is hard. New media alternatives has also caused on effect on presidential leadership as they now use them to be able to communicate younger generations, but targeting small groups of people.

Misinformation 
According to the Social Science Research Council, "We are in the midst of a perfect storm of misinformation, where the wrong information or lack of it can be deadly." Cognitive psychologists such as Lewandowsky et al. have defined misinformation as "any piece of information that is initially processed as valid but is subsequently retracted or corrected." There are two common types of misinformation according to Hochschild, a political scientist. There are inactive informed and active misinformed. Inactive informed is when one knows the right information but chooses to ignore it. Active misinformed is when one believes incorrect information and uses that incorrect information. People can move from active misinformed to active informed by being presented with information in ways that persuade them in an impactful way.

Social Media Misinformation 
Social Media affects public opinion as content that is created and shared can affect how individuals form an opinion on societal issues. According to Ambassador (ret.) Karen Kornbluh, senior fellow and director of the Digital Innovation and Democracy Initiative at the German Marshall Fund, Social Media has led to misinformation through radicalization to extremism. Social media platforms such as TikTok and YouTube recommend content that has the potential to spread misinformation due to the way their content algorithms are set up. Content that is more inflammatory tends to get sent out to users as it keeps them more engaged. This also allows extremist groups to coordinate and raise funds more easily.

Public Health Misinformation 
Public Health issues have become areas of misinformation within the public opinion field. According to the National Library of Medicine, "Misinformation can have negative effects in the real world, such as amplifying controversy about vaccines and propagating unproven cancer treatments." Medical misinformation has been relevant to changing public opinion in cases such as the HIV/AIDS epidemic. Originally, a myth was circulated that AIDS could be spread by touching people who were infected. This had implications for public opinion in regard to AIDS policies as the misinformation around the illness led to support for restrictive policies for people infected with HIV. Vaccines have also had health misinformation associated with it. According to the National Library of Medicine, misinformation has led people to take household disinfectants, such as hydroxychloroquine, as they thought it would help to treat Covid-19. The CDC performed a survey and found that out of 502 adults, 39% of respondents performed unsafe activities in order to treat COVID-19.

See also 
 CIA influence on public opinion
 Court of public opinion
 Opinion polls
 Public sphere
 Political socialization
 Public figure
 Truth

 Organizations
 American Association for Public Opinion Research
 European Society for Opinion and Marketing Research
 Roper Center for Public Opinion Research
 World Association for Public Opinion Research

 People
 Gabriel Tarde
 Ferdinand Tönnies
 Walter Lippmann

References

Bibliography 
 Cantril, Hadley and Mildred Strunk, eds. Public Opinion, 1935–1946 (1951), massive compilation of many public opinion polls online
 Edward L. Bernays, Crystallizing Public Opinion, 1923.
 Daniel L. Smail, Thelma Fernster, Fama. The Politics of Talk and Reputation, Ithaca, Cornell University Press, 2003.
 Jürgen Habermas, The Structural Transformation of the Public Sphere, 1989 (Strukturwandel der Öffentlichkeit, Neuwied 1962).
 Jacob Shamir/Michal Shamir, The Anatomy of Public Opinion, Ann Arbor: University of Michigan Press, 2000.
 Walter Lippmann, Public Opinion, 1922.
 Norman John Powell, Anatomy of Public Opinion, New York, Prentice-Hall, 1951.
  Julien Théry, "Fama : l'opinion publique comme preuve. Aperçu sur la révolution médiévale de l'inquisitoire (XIIe-XIVe siècles)", in B. Lemesle (ed.), La preuve en justice de l'Antiquité à nos jours, Rennes, Presses universitaires de Rennes, 2003, pp. 119–147, online.
 Ferdinand Tönnies, On Public Opinion, 1970 (Kritik der öffentlichen Meinung, 1922, critical edition by Alexander Deichsel, Rolf Fechner, and Rainer Waßner, Berlin/New York: Walter de Gruyter 2003)
Bianco, William T., and David T. Canon. "Public Opinion." In American Politics Today. 3rd ed. New York: W.W. Norton, 2013.

External links 

 World Public Opinion

 
Public sphere
Belief
Politics
Political science
Cultural trends
Social influence